A riparian forest or riparian woodland is a forested or wooded area of land adjacent to a body of water such as a river, stream, pond, lake, marshland, estuary, canal, sink or reservoir.

Etymology

The term riparian comes from the Latin word ripa, 'river bank'; technically it only refers to areas adjacent to flowing bodies of water such as rivers, streams, sloughs and estuaries.  However, the terms riparian forest and riparian zone have come to include areas adjacent to non-flowing bodies of water such as ponds, lakes, playas and reservoirs.

Characteristics

Riparian forests are subject to frequent inundation.

Riparian forests help control sediment, reduce the damaging effects of flooding and aid in stabilizing stream banks.

Riparian zones are transition zones between an upland terrestrial environment and an aquatic environment.  Organisms found in this zone are adapted to periodic flooding.  Many not only tolerate it, but require it in order to maintain health and complete their lifestyles.

Threats
Threats to riparian forests:

 Cleared for agricultural use because of the good soil quality
 Historically, trees used as wood fuel for steamships, steam locomotives, etc.
 Urban development (housing, roads, malls, etc.)
 Grazing 
 Mining
 Disrupted hydrology, such as dams and levees, which reduces the amount and/or frequency of flooding
 Invasive species

See also
 Bosque
 Gallery forest
 Management of Pacific Northwest riparian forests
 Riparian zone
 Tugay
 Swamp Oak Forests

References

External links
 "Assessing the Need for a Riparian Management System (RiMS)"—Iowa State University Extension Bulletin (2002)

Forests
Habitats
Riparian zone